Laurence Delasaux (born 31 March 1985) is a former English squash player. He achieved his highest career ranking of 65 in October 2010 during the 2010 PSA World Tour. Laurence moved to Toronto and became a coaching professional after retiring from international squash in 2012.

References 

1985 births
Living people
English male squash players
Sportspeople from Kingston upon Hull